Božur Matejić (born 20 December 1963 in Prokuplje) is a former Serbian Yugoslav footballer.

Club career
Matejić played for FK Borac Banja Luka in the Yugoslav First League. While playing for this club he won 1987–88 Yugoslav Cup in 1988. Actually, he played arena football better than stadium football according to many sources.

References

 
 
 Stats from 1991/92 at Tempo almanah, pag. 20

1963 births
Living people
People from Prokuplje
Serbian footballers
Yugoslav footballers
Yugoslav expatriate footballers
Expatriate footballers in Spain
CD Castellón footballers
FK Rad players
FK Borac Banja Luka players
FK Zemun players
Yugoslav First League players
La Liga players
Yugoslav expatriates in Spain

Association football midfielders